The 2012–13 season was FC Dinamo București's 64th consecutive season in Liga I. In this season, Dinamo played in Liga I, Cupa României and UEFA Europa League. The European place was earned after Dinamo won the Romanian Cup in the season before. Dinamo kept Dario Bonetti as head coach, and won the first trophy of the season, Romanian Supercup, with a win against champions CFR Cluj. But after that the good results failed to appear. Dinamo was eliminated from Europa League, and after 15 rounds, when the team laid on the seventh spot of the standings, Dario Bonetti was sacked and Dorinel Munteanu was brought to replace him. In the Romanian Cup, Dinamo was eliminated by CFR Cluj, after extra-time. At the end of 2012, Munteanu resigned citing his desire to coach abroad. His place was taken by Cornel Ţălnar. Under his spell, Dinamo started well the second half of the season and entered the fight for a European place. But after a round of poor results, Dinamo missed a place for a European competition for the first time since 1998.

Review

Pre-season
Dinamo started its preparations for the new season on 15 June, with the medical examination. Only one new player was present, Andrei Cristea, who returned to Dinamo after one and a half years spent in Germany. Another new player brought by Dinamo was Issa Ba, a Senegalese midfielder whose contract with CS Gaz Metan Mediaş expired. Instead, Dinamo released Iulian Tameş and Dorel Stoica on mutual agreement, and sold Adrian Scarlatache to Khazar Lankaran.

On 21 June, Dinamo left for Austria, for an 18 days training camp, during which, the team played a large number of friendly games. The first matches were against amateur football teams from the Bischofshofen region. Thus, Dinamo's manager, Dario Bonetti had the chance to see the entire team at work, and also the players brought from the youth team, or players on trial. The first important friendly game was played against Ukrainean champions, Shakhtar Donetsk. Dinamo lost the game 1–0. Dinamo failed to win any other friendly game played in Austria, losing five and drawing against Anorthosis Famagusta from Cyprus.

On 26 June, Dinamo lost an important player, Cosmin Moţi, sold to the Bulgarian team Ludogorets Razgrad. The defender who played more than six years for Dinamo was in his final part of his contract, and the Red Dogs accepted the offer because they could lose him for free in the next months.

Instead, Dinamo managed to sign Cristian Scutaru and Mircea Axente, both returning to Liga I where they played for Poli Timișoara. In the previous season, they played for Poli in the second division. Also, Dinamo signed the Bulgarian midfielder Boris Galchev, from CSKA Sofia.

Season

July
Dinamo started the season on a high note, winning the first match and consequently the first trophy. It was the Romanian Supercup, where Dinamo defeated the champions CFR Cluj, after penalties. The white and reds controlled the game, having a superior ball possession (60.4%)and a larger number of completed passes (534 vs. 308).

In Liga I, Dinamo played the first game against a newly promoted team, CSS Drobeta-Turnu Severin. In front of 14,500 spectators, Dinamo opened the score in the 51st minute, through Mircea Axente, at his first game for the white-reds. The home team equalized a couple of minutes later, but Ionel Dănciulescu, coming from the bench, brought all three points for Dinamo with a goal scored in the 80th minute. The same day, 20 July, Dinamo sold one of its symbols, Marius Niculae, a player grown at the club's academy, who left for a few years to play abroad, but returned to Dinamo. He was transferred to Liga I rivals FC Vaslui.

The first home game in this season was played on National Arena, where Dinamo decided to move for the entire season. On 29 July, Dinamo defeated CSMS Iaşi 5–2, George Ţucudean scoring four goals and offering the decisive pass for the fifth. The striker received the perfect ten in the Gazeta Sporturilor match chronicle.

August
The first false step came in the third round, when Dinamo met FC Brașov. In Braşov, Dinamo won only once since 2004, and the black series continued. Braşov led twice, but Dinamo came back every time, and the match ended in a tie.

In the fourth round, Dinamo should've met Rapid Bucuresti, but the game was postponed because at that time Dinamo played a friendly game against giants FC Barcelona. The game was played at National Arena in Bucharest, and although Barcelona won 2–0, Dinamo had moments when they rose to their rivals level.

Eight Dinamo players were called to the national teams for the friendly games played at 15 August. Two of them scored goals, Marius Alexe and George Ţucudean helping Romania U21 squad to win against Sweden U21.

Despite the big number of players who left to play internationally, Dinamo's game in the fifth round was not postponed and the manager was forced to change the squad a lot, players like Marius Alexe, Constantin Nica and Cosmin Matei being rested. Thus, Dinamo failed to win at Chiajna, against Concordia. The game ended 0-0.

The European season started badly for Dinamo. In front of 20,000 fans, at Arena Națională, Dinamo was beaten by the Ukrainian side Metalist Kharkiv, quarterfinalist in the Europa League the previous season.

In the sixth round, Dinamo came back to its old stadium, because Arena Nationala was not available due to a concert by Red Hot Chili Peppers. Only 4,000 fans came to see the match against Petrolul Ploiești. Dinamo took the lead in the third minute, when Srdjan Luchin scored with a header his first goal for the club in the championship. Previously, he scored two goals for Dinamo, both in the Romanian Cup. Petrolul equalised in the 29th minute, but Dario Bonetti's inspiration paid off in the second part. The manager sent Ţucudean on the pitch in the 62nd minute, and the striker scored in the injury time after a cross from Cătălin Munteanu.

In the second leg of the Europa League encounter, Dinamo could not produce a miracle. They were beaten at Kharkiv, 2–1.

September
The seventh round produce Dinamo's first defeat in the championship. In Ploiești, against Astra, Dinamo lost 1–0, the only goal being scored in the injury time, from a penalty kick. Dinamo played almost the entire second half with only 10 men, Paul Koulibaly being sent off in the 49th minute.

The break for the national teams didn't help, after that Dinamo suffering the third defeat in a row. This time, at home, against Romanian champions CFR Cluj.

The drought was ended at Cluj-Napoca, where Dinamo defeated Universitatea Cluj, 2–1. It was the first game of the season for Ionel Dănciulescu as a starter, and the striker scored one goal, his 209th in Liga I, from a penalty that he obtained. Alexandru Curtean scored the other goal for Dinamo. Three days later, Dinamo started with a win the campaign to defend the trophy in Cupa României. In front of their own fans, at Dinamo Stadium, the red-dogs defeated Vointa Sibiu after extra-time.

October
In the next championship round, Dinamo met the former leader, Pandurii Targu Jiu. The game was played at National Arena, under special conditions. Dinamo commemorated 12 years since Cătălin Hâldan died, and the supporters created a special captain armband, with Hâldan face. In this game, Ionel Dănciulescu played for the 490th time in Liga I, equalling a record detained so far by Costică Ştefănescu. Dănciulescu scored a goal against Pandurii, his 210th in Liga I. Dinamo defeated Pandurii 3–0. In the next game, at Mediaş, Dănciulescu played his 491st match in Liga I, after which he became the player with the most presences in the first league. The team failed to win the third game in a row, drawing with Gaz Metan, 2-2.

The competition took a break for the national team's games. After the break, Dinamo suffered another defeat at home. The newly promoted Gloria Bistriţa lead 2–0 at Arena Naţională, Dinamo managed to score a single goal and in the second half Ionel Dănciulescu missed a penalty.

The first Bucharest derby of the season was played on 22 October, against Rapid. The game was initially scheduled in August, but it was postponed due to the friendly game against FC Barcelona. Rapid took the lead after a goal from Daniel Pancu, in the 30th minute, but Marius Alexe scored twice, the second time from the penalty spot, and Dinamo won 2–1, climbling to the fifth place in the championship. After that, Dinamo continued its sinusoidal evolution, and failed to win against Ceahlăul Piatra Neamţ. The game ended in a goalless draw.

November
Dinamo started the month of November on a high note, managing to qualify to the quarterfinals stage of the Romanian Cup with a win in Târgu Jiu, against Pandurii. It was the second win in the season against this team, and the first loss suffered by Pandurii at home.

In the Eternal derby, against Steaua, Dinamo led at the half time, after a goal scored by Marius Alexe. After one hour, the referee, Alexandre Boucaut from Belgium, gave a penalty kick for Steaua, transformed by Raul Rusescu. In the 80th minute, the referee didn't see an obvious foul against Cosmin Matei, committed by Chipciu who should've been sent off for this foul. Two minutes later, Steaua scored for 2–1, and in the 87th minute, their third goal came, putting a 13 points distance between the two rivals.

Neither in the next game, Dinamo could not find the way to victory. The "White-and-reds" lost at home against FC Vaslui, 1–0. Thus, this is the worst start of a season in 41 years for Dinamo, since 1971. As a consequence, Bonetti was sacked and Dorinel Munteanu was installed the new head coach. Munteanu signed a contract for two and a half years. His debut game was in Constanța, against Viitorul. The game was only two days after his installation, so he didn't change much the team comparing with the usual players used by Bonetti. The game ended in a draw, 1-1, after Viitorul failed to convert a penalty in the first half, when the score was 0-0.

The first win under Dorinel Munteanu came against the trainer's former team, Oţelul Galaţi. Dinamo won the game 2–1.

In the quarter-finals of the Romanian Cup, Dinamo played away against CFR Cluj. Despite having a player sent-off, Boubacar Mansaly in the 31st minute, Dinamo took the lead in the 60th minute, due to a goal scored by Marius Alexe. Rafael Bastos equalized in the 66th minute, then Gabriel Mureşan scored the winning goal in the 101st minute, transforming a free kick. Dinamo ended the game with nine players on the pitch, Constantin Nica being sent-off in the final minutes. Dinamo lost 2–1, and failed to defend its trophy.

December
The month of December started well for Dinamo who won the game against CS Severin, 4–2. The game was played at the Dinamo stadium, instead of Arena Naţională, and brought only 200 people in the stands. Dinamo remained unbeaten with Munteanu for another game, as the match against CSMS Iaşi ended in a draw. The pitch was covered in snow and made the players' mission heavier.

At the end of the year, after only one month and five games in charge at Dinamo, Dorinel Munteanu resigned as head coach, citing the wish to follow his dream to coach abroad. His replacement was Cornel Ţălnar who started his fifth spell at the helm of the team.

January
After the winter holiday, Dinamo started its preparations for the second half of the season with a training period at Poiana Braşov, during which, the new coach, Cornel Ţălnar, concentrated on physical exercises.

On 21 January, Dinamo announced that defender Cristian Pulhac ended his contract after almost 11 years spent at the club. Dinamo also parted ways with striker George Ţucudean, sold to Standard Liège.

February
The first official game of the spring season was played against FC Brașov. The game was played at Dinamo stadium, the club decided to move back to its own arena and kept only two games at Arena Naţională, the games against Steaua şi Astra Ploieşti. Against Braşov, Dinamo won 2–1, after two goals from Marius Alexe. The visitors played with only ten men from the 40th minute, after Cristian Ionescu was sent off.

March
The month of March started perfectly for Dinamo who won the derby against Rapid, played in Giulești stadium. Ionel Dănciulescu scored the only goal of the game.

On 14 March, the club changed its owner. Businessman Ionuț Negoiță bought the stocks that belonged to Nicolae Badea and Dragoş Săvulescu and gained control of 90% of the club.

On 16 March, Dănciulescu made his 500th appearance in Liga I, becoming the first player in history to reach this mile. The event happened in a game lost by Dinamo against Petrolul Ploieşti.

For the game against Astra Giurgiu, Dinamo returned to National Arena, and more than 17.000 fans came to support the team. Dinamo won the game 1–0, after a goal scored by Marius Alexe in the middle of the first half. Before the game, Ionel Dănciulescu was awarded for the 500 appearances in Liga I. He received an award from the club, given by two of Dinamo's legends, Cornel Dinu and Ion Nunweiller, and an award from the CCA – Referees' Commission, given by the referee of the game, Sebastian Colţescu.

April
Dinamo began April with a 1–0 win away at CFR Cluj, marked their fifth win in six league games. This saw the team climbing to number four in the rankings, two points behind Astra Giurgiu, the team placed on the second spot. Dănciulescu scored the only goal against CFR Cluj.

In the 22nd minute of the Cluj-Napoca game, Dinamo's captain, Cătălin Munteanu was injured. He suffered a rupture of the cruciate ligaments at the right knee and he was operated at a clinic in Turkey.

On 14 April, Dinamo failed to win against Universitatea Cluj, in a game played at Arena Naţională. The Cluj-Napoca team, managed by former Dinamo player Ionel Ganea, opened the score, but Nicolae Muşat scored his first goal for Dinamo and brought a point for the "red dogs". The following round, Dinamo lost away, against Pandurii. This was the first game in 2013 without a goal scored by Dinamo. The team returned quickly to the winning ways with the victory against Gaz Metan Mediaş, the following round. Alexe scored the first goal in this game, his 11th of the Liga I season, and Andrei Cristea ended his goal drought, scoring his first goal of the season.

May
In the first game of May, Dinamo travelled to Bistriţa to meet Gloria, the last team in the standings. Cornel Ţălnar had a few changes in the squad, Dorin Rotariu, 17 years, being used in the starting 11 for the first time in his career. Gloria led after a goal scored by Andrei Enescu, but Marius Alexe scored twice, each time from the penalty spot, and Dinamo took all the three points.

Alexe scored again in the following game, at home, against Ceahlăul, but his goal was not enough for a win. The game ended with a draw, 1-1.

On 10 May, Dinamo met its biggest rival, Steaua. The game was played at Arena Naţională, in front of 43,789 spectators. Steaua won 2–0, Dinamo losing for the fourth time in a row in the Eternal derby.

Dinamo continued its bad shape the following week, when they lost against FC Vaslui, 4–1, the biggest loss suffered during the entire season. The next game brought another defeat. This time, at home, against Viitorul Constanţa. Dinamo led 2–1, but the visitors scored twice in the final half-hour and won 3–2. After this match, Dinamo lost all chances to qualify for a European competition, ending a period of 15 consecutive years in the continental cups.

The final game of the season was played away at Oţelul Galaţi. Dinamo won 1-0 after a goal scored by Mircea Axente. Despite this win, Dinamo finished the season on the sixth place.

Squad changes

Transfers in:

Transfers out:

Player statistics

Squad statistics

Statistics accurate as of match played 28 May 2013

Disciplinary record
Includes all competitive matches.

Last updated on 28 May 2013

Club

Technical staff

Competitions

Overall
FC Dinamo plays in four competitions: Liga I, UEFA Europa League, Cupa României and Supercupa României.

Liga I

Standings

Results summary

Results by round

Results

Competitive

Liga I
Kickoff times are in EET.

UEFA Europa League

Cupa României

Supercupa României

Non competitive matches

References

2012-13
2012–13 UEFA Europa League participants seasons
Romanian football clubs 2012–13 season